Va-Bank (Georgian alphabet: ვა-ბანკი, transliterated as "va-banki") is the Georgian version of Deal or No Deal. It was shown on Rustavi 2 from November 11, 2008 to June 23, 2009 and hosted by Misha Mshvildadze.

This show uses the music of the American version, the set is also similar to that version. There are 26 models, each carries a briefcase containing prizes between 0.01 lari (about 0.6¢ US) and 50,000 lari (about US$21,500).

On February 3, 2009, two Georgian soccer players, Rezo and Archil Arveladze, won the top prize.

Case values

Deal or No Deal
2008 Georgia (country) television series debuts
2009 Georgia (country) television series endings
Georgia (country) television series
2000s Georgia (country) television series
Rustavi 2 original programming